Tollet may refer to:

Places
Tollet, municipality in the district of Grieskirchen in the Austrian state of Upper Austria

People
André Tollet (1913–2001), French upholsterer, trade unionist and communist
Claude Tollet (born 1949), French professional road bicycle racer
Elizabeth Tollet (1694–1754), British poet
George Tollet (died 1719), British mathematician and naval administrator